The fourteenth season of British science fiction television series Doctor Who began on 4 September 1976 with The Masque of Mandragora, and ended with The Talons of Weng-Chiang. The third Fourth Doctor series, it was the final series of Philip Hinchcliffe's production, whilst Robert Holmes stayed till The Sun Makers in the next series.

Casting

Main cast 
 Tom Baker as the Fourth Doctor
 Elisabeth Sladen as Sarah Jane Smith
 Louise Jameson as Leela

Tom Baker continues his role as the Fourth Doctor. Sarah Jane Smith (Elisabeth Sladen) departs in The Hand of Fear, before the Doctor is joined by Leela (Louise Jameson) in The Face of Evil. Uniquely in the 'classic' era of Doctor Who, no companion appears in The Deadly Assassin.

Guest stars
The Master reappears in The Deadly Assassin as the main antagonist, his first appearance since Frontier in Space (1973), this time played by Peter Pratt. The character would not make a further appearance until five years later in 1981.

Serials 

The Masque of Mandragora saw the debut of the new wood-panelled "Secondary Console Room" set, which was to be used as the main TARDIS console room throughout the season. The season took a five-week transmission break between the broadcasts of The Deadly Assassin and The Face of Evil in order to extend the season further into 1977, allowing Robert Holmes time to work on the final serial The Talons of Weng-Chiang.

Broadcast
The entire season was broadcast from 4 September 1976 to 2 April 1977.

Home media

VHS releases

Betamax releases

DVD and Blu-ray releases

In print

References

Bibliography
 

1976 British television seasons
1977 British television seasons
Season 14
Season 14
14